Markus Åkesson (born 10 July 1975) is a Swedish artist working with painting and glass sculpture. He lives and works in Nybro, Sweden with his wife, the ceramist Ellen Ehk. His painting studio is in the former Glass Factory at Pukeberg in Nybro and he collaborates with the glass studio Kosta Boda. He is one of the most prominent international painters in the neo-figurative style.

He is represented by Galerie Da-End in Paris, Berg Gallery in Stockholm and by VIDA Museum & Konsthall on Öland in Sweden. His works are represented in private and public collections such as The Alice L. Walton Foundation, The Lord James Palumbo Collection, Jacques-Antoine Granjon Collection, and Foundation Francés.

Early life and education 
Åkesson was born in the small village of Sporsjö outside of Kalmar in South-East Sweden  surrounded by seemingly boundless forests, making it impossible to grasp the horizon. His father worked as a forester, and his mother, a homemaker. Åkesson was the youngest of four boys and spent many childhood hours drawing the world around him, nurtured by the universes of comic books in which he had a great interest. He is passionate about myths and magic, and is especially fond of the forest that makes them almost real. Growing up surrounded by woods, this magical environment has been Markus' primary source of inspiration since a young age, encouraging his imagination and keeping its mystery, beauty and ancient lore alive. In an interview with Johanna Sandell from the book, Insomnia, Åkesson says "To anyone who knows my history, it’s not difficult to see connections [to my childhood] in my paintings. I grew up in the countryside, in the forest. I played a lot on my own, I was always out in the forest and I drew a lot".

Not coming from an artistic family, Åkesson’s creativity manifested itself in the ways that came most naturally in his world. In high school, he studied to be a mechanic and spent his free time airbrushing designs on cars and motorcycles. Growing up in the heart of Sweden's "Crystal Kingdom" it was natural for the artistically inclined to gravitate towards work in the glass industry, and as an adult, he found a job as a crystal engraver in a nearby factory. 

Unlike many of his Scandinavian peers, Åkesson has limited formal academic training. He studied briefly at Ölands Folkhögskola, but is otherwise self-taught, taking most of his cues from history, philosophy, and literature. In this period, his culture expands at a great speed, and he discovers the work of other figurative artists like Lucian Freud, Michaël Borremans or Jenny Saville.

Paintings 

Åkesson's realistic style of oil painting was not in vogue during his early years as an artist and one of the modern world's most traditional forms of visual art was therefore considered an untraditional choice for a young Scandinavian artist in the 1990's. However, after establishing himself locally, Markus Åkesson had several solo exhibitions and public works projects early on in his career that proved to be important stepping stones towards his current representation and international acknowledgment.  

In 2013 the French gallery Da-End contacts the Swedish artist to start a collaboration that lasts until today. A first painting, The Weight (150 x 250 cm), illustrating an elephant laying on a carpet, is exhibited the same year at the Grand Palais on the occasion of the international contemporary art fair Art Paris Art Fair. This will be followed by solo and group exhibitions in galleries and institutional venues.

Markus Åkesson's artistic tone has been likened to that of the Pre-Raphaelites, a group from which he has indicated that he has drawn a great deal of inspiration. Contrastingly, his work with patterns and fabrics is laced with symbolism and is an obvious point to Magical Realism in its more recent definition. A commentary on Åkesson’s solo exhibition Strange Days written by French critic Grégoire Prangé describes his work by saying, "A painting by Magritte comes to mind, a magnificent kiss from two veiled lovers, an impersonal embrace, universal love. In all these works, hidden behind a succession of mythical motifs, lies human nature and all its secrets. But Markus, by drawing the contours of it, little by little, will end up painting its portrait."

He takes the subject of his work from a medical term called "Dysmorphia". Dysmorphia is one of the most common mental disorders that some people suffer from today, and perhaps those who are hidden in his paintings next to the beautiful fabrics suffer from this disorder.

The in-between 
Markus Åkesson's works are greatly influenced by myths and fairytales. During his early years of painting, his work revolved around themes such as the passage from childhood to adolescence, with a tinge of mystery and a rather dark atmosphere. As Markus works a lot with series of paintings, his series The Woods, Black Pond and Psychopomp Club, exhibited in his solo show The Woods' in 2013 at the Da-End gallery, transcribes his pictorial universe of the time, representing children in an enigmatic space, people half asleep, skulls of animals, psychopomps, settings full of symbols and nods to nature. All his paintings seem to have as a common thread the theme of the in-between, a recurring topic in all of his series. 

This state of in-between, this aspect of transition from one state to another is something that have long preoccupied Markus Åkesson. We find symbols in his works that takes us to rites of passages, such as children and adolescents inhabiting his imagery, being between childhood and adulthood, between sleep and being awake, between presence and dreaming. By working in a classical way with brushes and oil paint and projecting models from the real world – such as his children – in these mysterious environments, he allows the viewer to go on a journey in a place in-between, not exactly a fact but not exactly fiction, causing this state of awe, this transitional moment where the paintings act as “windows that allow the audience to glance into another world”.  

 The patterns 
Patterns have always been present in Markus Åkesson's pictorial universe. Starting rather shyly with patterns on rugs and tapestries, he begins to integrate textiles more prominently into his paintings in his solo show "Let me sleep through the night" (2018). Plunged into mysterious situations with a psychological dimension carried by the subjects and the settings, Markus' works are filled with various ornaments, drapes and clothes. He then gradually began to focus entirely on fabric and its patterns, which eventually became the primary subject of his paintings, especially with his series "Now you see me" shown in his solo show Strange Days (2020). We find the silhouettes usually present in Markus' paintings, but this time they are completely hidden, covered with sheets of various patterns and textures.

 Sleeping Beauty scandal 
Åkesson often speaks of a "mythical world that parallels everyday life". It was natural then, that his works often reflected the mysteries of childhood during the years that his own children were young. During this time he was commissioned to do several public works projects, both paintings and sculptures. The most recent of which was commissioned by a grade school in Ängelholm, Sweden. Åkesson was asked to create a large painting in the setting of a dark forest. He chose to paint his interpretation of the familiar story, Sleeping Beauty. The primary subject of the painting is a young girl in a bright red dress, surrounded by a group of children who are staring off into the distance. The girl in the red dress is lying on a pink and orange quilt on an iron bed-frame. When the work was delivered, employees of the school felt that the painting was too ominous to hang in the cafeteria, its intended place. The painting, Sleeping Beauty, now hangs in the school's library. 
 
The incident sparked nationwide interest and led to discussions surrounding censorship and challenges facing modern children.

Åkesson's response to the school's decision was evidently rooted in curiosity. In an interview with The Swedish Television agency, he says, "I find the debate that has surfaced in response to the incident very interesting. It is rather eye-opening to witness the power of art in our society, that it can have such a strong effect on our emotions."

In 2018, Kalmar Konstmuseum curated a retrospective exhibition of Åkesson’s work titled Sleeping Beauty, due, in part, to the school's reaction to the painting.

 Collaboration 
In 2013, during his solo show "The Woods" at the French gallery Da-End, designer Jun Takahashi discovered the work of Markus Åkesson. Some time later, he became fascinated with his work and would state his desire to collaborate with the painter. The collaboration is materialized by the printing of 3 paintings on shawls for the Fall/Winter 2014 ready-to-wear collection, which was shown in 2014 at the Palais de Tokyo during Paris Fashion Week.

Jun Takahashi reiterated his collaboration with Åkesson for the Fall/Winter 2021 collection, in which 4 of Markus Åkesson's paintings were selected (Chesterfield dreams (Edvin), 2011, Childs Play, 2011, Insomnia (Moths), 2017, The Woods (Insomnia), 2013) and printed on outerwear as well as knitwear and shirts for both the men's and women's entire collections.

 Glass Sculptures 
Before becoming a painter, Åkesson was trained as a welder when he was young. Then he started his job as a glass engraver when he was around 20s. He loved working with the creative manner in the glass industry,  but after a while he found the urge to express himself through another method which is oil painting.
Now Åkesson has his own atelier in an old Glass Factory called Pukeberg. In 2021 Åkesson returned to the glass industry, this time as an art glass design partner for Kosta Boda.It was through his wife and fellow artist, Ellen Ehk Åkesson that Åkesson came into contact with Kosta Boda. Since spring 2021, the couple has shared a studio in Kosta, in addition to their studios in the old Pukeberg Glassworks in Nybro. They share numerous intersecting points, not just privately but also artistically, having grown up near one another in the forests of Småland. The mystery of the forest is a strongly shared theme in their art. Ever since his time as a glass engraver, Markus Åkesson has experienced what he calls a powerful pull to glass. He has previously experimented with glass sculptures.

Some of his earliest glass pieces were exhibited at the Duo-exhibition 'Skogens Hjärta' at VIDA Museum & Konstall in the spring of 2021. His art glass was also exhibited alongside his paintings at Market Art Fair in Stockholm in the spring of 2022. We find his use of patterns in his sculptures as well, which he spends the most time engraving.

In 2022, along with Kosta Boda, Åkesson created a glass sculpture "Medusa" that shows the supple side of the glass. This sculpture was exhibited in the exhibition "Μέδουσα | Scyphozoa" at Da-End Gallery in Paris.

 Collections 

 Fondation Francès, FR
 Jacques-Antoine Granjon Collection, FR
 The National Museum of Glass, SE
 The National Public Art Council, SE
 Panevėžys, Lithuania
 Nybro Municipality, SE
 Emmaboda Municipality, SE
 Kalmar Municipality, SE
 Linköping Municipality, SE
 Walton Family Foundation, US
 The Lord James Palumbo Collection, UK
 Annette & Peder Bonnier Collection, US
 Jonas & Helena Bonnier Collection, SE
 The Alice L. Walton Foundation, US

 Exhibitions 
2013
 The Woods, Da-End Gallery, Paris
 Art Paris Art Fair, with Da-End Gallery, Grand Palais, Paris
 Cabinet Da-End 03, group exhibition, Da-End Gallery, Paris
2014
 Cabinet Da-End 04, group exhibition, Da-End Gallery, Paris
2015
 Rough Dreams, VIDA Museum, Sweden
 Dedications and Declarations, group exhibition, Cognacq-Jay Museum, Paris
 Under Realism, group exhibition, Da-End Gallery, Paris
 Cabinet Da-End 05, group exhibition, Da-End Gallery, Paris
2016
 ABOVE THE LINE/BELOW THE LINE, Francès Fondation, Clichy-La-Garonne, France
 YIA Art Fair, with Da-End Gallery, Brussels, Belgium
 The milk of human kindness, duo show with Lucy Glendinning, Da-End Gallery, Paris
 Cabinet Da-End 06, group exhibition, Da-End Gallery, Paris
 16th International Vilnius Painting Triennial, Vilnius, Lithuania
 “Vinterutställning” (Winter exhibition), VIDA Museum, Sweden
2017
 Cabinet Da-End 07, group exhibition, Da-End Gallery, Paris
2018
 Let me sleep through the night, Da-End Gallery, Paris
 Sleeping Beauty, Kalmar Konstmuseum, Kalmar, Sweden
 Markus Åkesson and art collection, Kalmar Kontmuseum, Kalmar, Sweden
 Insomnia, VIDA Museum, Sweden
 La Fabrique Du Regard, Francès Fondation, Senlis, France
 Cabinet Da-End 08, group exhibition, Da-End Gallery, Paris
 Loup Y Es/Tu?, group exhibition, Maisons-Laffite, France
2019

 Cabinet Da-End 09, group exhibition, Da-End Gallery, Paris

2020
 Strange Days, Da-End Gallery, Paris
 Cabinet X, group exhibition, Da-End Gallery, Paris
2021
 Swedish Design Movement, Institut Suédois, Paris
 Skogens Hjärta, VIDA Museum, Sweden
 Now You See Me, '' Berg Gallery, Stockholm2022'''

 Μέδουσα | Scyphozoa, group exhibition, Da-End Gallery, Paris
 The Roses of Heliogabalus, Da-End Gallrey, Paris

References

External links 
 www.markusakesson.com

1975 births
People from Kalmar County
20th-century Swedish painters
21st-century Swedish painters
Living people